Sicklers Mountain is a mountain located in the Catskill Mountains of New York north-northwest of Windham. Stevens Mountain is located northwest, and Mount Royal is located west of Sicklers Mountain.

References

Mountains of Schoharie County, New York
Mountains of New York (state)